WNKY (channel 40) is a television station in Bowling Green, Kentucky, United States, affiliated with NBC and CBS. Owned by Marquee Broadcasting, the station maintains studios on Chestnut Street in downtown Bowling Green, and its transmitter is located on Pilot Knob near Smiths Grove along U.S. Route 68 and I-65.

History

As an independent station

The FCC granted a construction permit for channel 40 on October 21, 1983, to local businessman John Cunningham. In 1988, Bob Rodgers, president of Word Broadcasting of Louisville, purchased the construction permit from Cunningham about two years after the successful launch of upstart station WBNA in that city.

The newly-licensed station began broadcasting as WQQB on December 17, 1989. At its first sign-on, the outlet operated as a religious independent station airing an analog signal on UHF channel 40. Early on, it struggled in a small market used to all-VHF stations, where ABC affiliate WBKO (channel 13) was all but dominant in Bowling Green proper, while stations from Nashville and to a lesser extent, Louisville, were easily received either over-the-air or via cable and had equal loyalty that WQQB struggled to overcome. In the rush to come to air, it also had a poor overall signal that wasn't easily received and regular technical problems, along with little to no coverage on cable systems outside the immediate Bowling Green area, as revised must-carry rules would not come into effect for another three years.

As a Fox affiliate
In Summer 1991, Word Broadcasting Network sold WQQB to Southeastern Communications for $1 million. This came as Word Broadcasting president Bob Rodgers assumed additional duties as church pastor and his decision to concentrate solely on operating WBNA in terms of the company's media efforts. 

For WQQB's first few months under Southeastern ownership, it switched to a general entertainment format with a mixture of low-budget syndicated programming, like old movies, sitcoms, and cartoons.
On January 10, 1992, WQQB changed its call letters to WKNT and became the area's first Fox affiliate with the then-new on-air branding as Fox 40. During its time as a Fox station in the 1990s, WKNT broadcast select Southeastern Conference football games via Jefferson Pilot Sports until 2002 when WBKO started to air those games to go with JP Sports (later Lincoln Financial Sports, then Raycom Sports) SEC basketball broadcasts. From 1993 to 1997, the station also aired the controversial ABC drama NYPD Blue for its first four seasons due to WBKO's refusal to air that program. Except on Saturday, WKNT also aired programming from the Shop at Home Network from 1:00 a.m. to 5:00a.m. until that network's closure in 2005. Despite being a Fox affiliate, UPN's syndicated program block Disney's One Too aired on the station from 7:00 to 9:00 a.m. weekday mornings and from 5:00 to 7:00 a.m. Sunday mornings to cover the children's educational programming requirements. It was the only UPN programming that was ever available in Bowling Green; all other UPN programming was only receivable via WUXP-TV (now a MyNetworkTV affiliate) in Nashville, as the de facto UPN affiliate for Bowling Green.

On January 1, 1997, the operation of WKNT was taken over by Crossroads Communications under a local marketing agreement (LMA). Crossroads, a subsidiary of Northwest Broadcasting, would buy the station outright on July 17, 2000.

Unexpected loss of Fox affiliation and Switch to NBC
In March 2001, Fox announced that it had dropped its affiliation with WKNT because the station did not comply with the terms of the affiliation agreement; almost immediately, NBC agreed to affiliate with the station. On March 27, 2001, the affiliation switch to NBC occurred, and the station changed its call sign to WNKY. At the same time, the station boosted its power from 776,000 watts to 1,640,000 watts, directional with a null to the east. Previously, WBKO was the only station within the Bowling Green market that was affiliated with a Big Three network, and WSMV-TV in Nashville was NBC's affiliate of record in south-central Kentucky. After WNKY switched to NBC, WSMV's over-the-air signal was still available in parts of the Bowling Green market where WNKY could not reach, and some cable systems continued to carry WSMV. Following the loss of WNKY's Fox affiliation, Fox programming was provided to most of the Bowling Green market on cable via Nashville affiliate WZTV, which is also available over-the-air in the southern portion of the market; cable systems in Hart and Metcalfe Counties carried Louisville Fox affiliate WDRB instead.

Max Media ownership
In March 2003, Northwest Broadcasting sold WNKY to Max Media for $7 million. On December 12 of that year, it signed on a digital signal on UHF channel 16 from its transmitter tower in Smiths Grove. WNKY-DT was then added to digital cable systems including Insight in Bowling Green and the Electric Plant Board in Glasgow.

On August 7, 2004, WNKY began airing NBC network programming in high definition just in time to broadcast the network's coverage of the 2004 Summer Olympics in Athens. WNKY also installed a Dolby model 569 AC-3 surround sound encoder to relay the 5.1 full surround audio from the network.

On June 3, 2010, as a result of the Satellite Television Extension and Localism Act of 2010, Dish Network began offering both of WNKY's digital subchannels.

Misuse of the EAS tones
The Federal Communications Commission (FCC) fined the station's licensee, MMK License, $39,000 on November 5, 2013, due to a mid-June 2012 ad filmed and aired by WNKY which featured Emergency Alert System (EAS) tones used in a promotional and non-warning situation. WNKY was also required to launch a local campaign about the EAS, air additional emergency preparation public service announcements, and lease space on their tower for modernized warning equipment to the Warren County Emergency Management agency and the City of Bowling Green.

Cable carriage dispute in Glasgow
On January 1, 2015, the Glasgow Electric Plant Board dropped both of WNKY's digital subchannels from its lineup because of a 1,000 percent increase in cost. Both WNKY and WNKY-DT2 returned to the Electric Plant Board's cable lineup in February 2015 after agreeing to a 100 percent increase instead of 1,000. The digital subchannels were placed on different channels (WNKY on 16 and WNKY-DT2 on 23) without high definition service.

Sale to Marquee Broadcasting
On April 5, 2017, Max Media announced that it would sell WNKY to Marquee Broadcasting for $5.6 million. The sale was completed on June 30.

In February 2021, the station relocated from its previous facility on Emmett Avenue on Bowling Green's west side to its current broadcasting facility on Chestnut Street in downtown Bowling Green.

Subchannel history

WNKY-DT2
WNKY-DT2 is the CBS-affiliated second digital subchannel of WNKY, broadcasting in high definition on channel 40.2.

On October 11, 2006, WNKY reached an agreement with CBS to air that network on a new digital subchannel. It was officially launched as WNKY-DT2 on February 1, 2007, which finally gave Bowling Green a locally-based CBS station. Until that point, the Bowling Green market was one of the few areas east of the Mississippi River without its own CBS affiliate, and the area were served by WTVF in Nashville and WLKY in Louisville as the de facto CBS affiliates. In spite of the existence of WNKY-DT2, WTVF remains available to Mediacom cable customers in Butler and Edmonson counties, including Morgantown and Brownsville, as well as customers of Insight Communications (later Time Warner Cable, now Spectrum) in Bowling Green, and the South Central Rural Telephone Cooperative in the Glasgow area. As of December 2017, WNKY claimed exclusivity of NBC and CBS affiliates on the Glasgow Electric Plant Board cable system. In January 2018, the CBS subchannel was upgraded to high definition, albeit in 720p rather than the network's recommended 1080i format to preserve bandwidth. A direct-to-cable full 1080i high definition feed of WNKY-DT2 is available on select cable providers.

WNKY-DT3 
WNKY-DT3 is the MeTV-affiliated third digital subchannel of WNKY, broadcasting in standard definition on channel 40.3.

WNKY broadcast a testing loop on a new subchannel on December 20, 2017; the testing loop promoted MeTV. This third subchannel began to carry MeTV on January 1, 2018.

Programming

WNKY
In addition to the entire NBC network schedule, syndicated programming on the main channel (as of September 2022) includes Judge Judy, Entertainment Tonight, Jeopardy!, The Jennifer Hudson Show, You Bet Your Life, and Dr. Phil, among others. (Jeopardy!s sister game show, Wheel of Fortune, airs on WBKO, making the Bowling Green market one of the few markets in the United States where both programs air on separate stations.) On weekends, The Simpsons, which has been a longtime staple of the station's syndication lineup, along with Cars.TV, MyDestination.TV, and Marquee Backstage are aired.

WNKY-DT2
WNKY-DT2 clears the entire CBS network schedule, including the weekday and Saturday morning editions of CBS Mornings and the entire CBS Dream Team lineup. Like most CBS affiliates in the Central Time Zone, the station airs The Young and the Restless at 11 a.m.

As of September 2022, syndicated programming on WNKY-DT2 includes AgDay, Modern Family, Hot Bench, Judge Mathis, and Family Feud, among others. On weekends, WNKY-DT2 also airs The Simpsons, Pets.TV, and The World's Funniest Weather, among others. Beginning on September 10, 2022,  WNKY-DT2 also airs Titans All Access on weekends during the NFL season.

Sports programming
In 2016, WNKY and WNKY-DT2 began broadcasting Tennessee Titans preseason games not nationally televised, which originate from Nashville's ABC affiliate WKRN-TV, to complement the NFL on CBS package that includes most of the Titans' regular season games. This initially applied in non-Olympic years as WNKY-DT2 broadcast the first two preseason games when NBC covered the 2016 Summer Olympics. In 2018, WNKY announced that from then on, the station would carry all Titans preseason games on its MeTV-affiliated subchannel, WNKY-DT3. Other than those broadcasts, WNKY-DT3 clears the entire MeTV schedule.

News operation

As the first commercial television station to launch in Bowling Green, WBKO has been a longtime leader according to Nielsen ratings. Even after the sign-on of WQQB in 1989, WBKO has remained the dominant outlet for south central Kentucky. However, it has also competed with Nashville stations transmitting into parts of the Bowling Green area. As the area's original Fox affiliate, WKNT's first newscasts began in 1994, when the station teamed up with Campbellsville-based WGRB (also a Fox affiliate at the time, later a WB/CW affiliate WBKI-TV, now a defunct station) to form a two-station cooperative local "network" to jointly produce a local newscast. This joint news department even employed local students from Western Kentucky University in varied aspects. This lasted until late 1996 or early 1997 due to low ratings, especially on WKNT's part, due to WBKO's continued dominance in news ratings in the Bowling Green area.

After the station's switch to NBC, newscasts returned to the station's schedule when WNKY began simulcasting WSMV's 10 p.m. newscasts in April 2001. These simulcasts lasted until the end of the 2002–03 television season, when they were replaced with syndicated programming. However, only the introduction originated from WNKY, and a WNKY logo covered WSMV's channel 4 logo. WNKY's commercials usually cover up the commercials run by WSMV.

On September 10, 2005, WNKY slowly re-entered the market with an unusual weather-only approach. Instead of full newscasts, it offers weekday morning and nightly local weather forecast cut-ins provided through AccuWeather. It began airing five-minute First Look AccuWeather forecasts on weeknights. In December of that year, weekend weather forecasts were added to the schedule. 

In January 2006, local weather updates began airing during NBC's Today Show on weekday mornings from 7 a.m. until 11 a.m. The updates cover regular and severe weather events. The weather team consists of four employees—three human and one non-human member, "Radar the Weather Dog". Radar was a purebred Border Collie that was adopted from the Bowling Green/Warren County Humane Society in 2005. Radar began serving as the station's mascot when the weather show began with meteorologist Chris Sowers. Viewers would often see Radar interacting with one of the three meteorologists as they begin the weather updates. The weather dog idea may have been inspired by KPRC-TV in Houston which once had its own "Radar, the Weather Dog". WNKY's former sister station KYTX, in Tyler, Texas, took a similar approach with "Stormy, the Weather Dog." Radar died at age 16 in December 2017. He was replaced by his sister, "Soky", as the station's mascot.

In late January 2009, in a second attempt to compete with WBKO, WNKY launched a weekday morning show called Bowling Green Today produced in partnership with the Bowling Green Daily News. It aired for a half-hour at 6:30 a.m. The newspaper provides short local news updates and WNKY produces traditional weather segments. The show is replayed at 9 a.m. on WNKY's CBS-affiliated second subchannel. Weather forecasts from this station can be heard on radio stations WBGN-AM 1340, WBVR-FM 96.7, WUHU-FM 107.1, and WLYE-FM 94.1. WNKY did not produce newscasts in the traditional 5 p.m. and 10 p.m. slots or on weekends. During the summer of 2012, WNKY debuted a weekend news magazine program called In KY News, which included interviews and highlighted events in and around south central Kentucky.

On October 26, 2015, Bowling Green Today was renamed SoKY Sunrise, and was expanded to a one-hour program. On April 10, 2017, a new program titled SoKY at Noon made its debut on WNKY-DT2.

On February 19, 2018, WNKY began broadcasting live half-hour newscasts weeknights at 5 p.m. on its main channel, and at 6 p.m. on WNKY-DT2. This marked the first time WNKY broadcast an eveming newscast in any timeslot since the station ended simulcasts of WSMV's 10 p.m. newscasts in 2003.  

From November 6 to 13, 2020, the station's newscasts were temporarily suspended because some employees were possibly exposed to COVID-19. Newscasts resumed on November 16.

On July 19, 2021, WNKY debuted its 10 p.m. weeknight newscast on its main subchannel. On March 7, 2022, the station began to simulcast their 10 p.m. newscasts over WNKY and WNKY-DT2. The simulcast of SoKY Sunrise between the main channel and the DT2 subchannel began in January 2023. 

As of January 2023, the station produces a total of 15½ hours per week of news content. This includes 10 hours of news content on the main channel and five hours exclusively on WNKY-DT2; 1.5 hours of news content is simulcast between the DT1 and DT2 subchannels. However, the station continues to produce the six-minute weather updates on Saturday and Sunday nights at 10 p.m. on the DT1 and DT2 subchannels.

Technical information

Subchannels
The station's digital signal is multiplexed:

Analog-to-digital transition
On June 12, 2009, WNKY turned off its analog transmitter in compliance with the FCC-mandated digital TV transition of 2009. The station's digital signal remained on its pre-transition channel assignment, UHF channel 16, using PSIP to see it displayed as virtual channel 40. WNKY was the last station within the Bowling Green market to make the transition.

Spectrum reallocation 
After the FCC's 2016 spectrum auction, WNKY filed for a construction permit for its digital subchannel to relocate to UHF channel 24. WNKY changed to its current frequency at 12:01 a.m. on October 18, 2019.

Availability
WNKY is available over-the-air and on all cable television systems throughout the Bowling Green DMA, which includes Barren, Butler, Edmonson, Hart, Metcalfe and Warren Counties in southern Kentucky. In Bowling Green, the station is available on Spectrum Cable channels 7 (as NBC), 10 (as CBS), and 189 (as MeTV).

Out-of-market coverage
WNKY has limited out-of-market coverage due in part to the station's 90,000-watt signal (previously 120,000 watts before the spectrum repack in 2019) and its small coverage area, especially since the 2009 digital TV transition. However, the station's broadcast signal can be received in some of the northernmost areas of the Nashville media market, including the Kentucky counties of Allen, Monroe, Simpson, and much of Logan County in Kentucky, along with much of Macon and Sumner counties of northern middle Tennessee. Some areas in the southwestern portions of the Louisville market like Grayson and Green counties can also pick up WNKY's signal. Both WNKY and WNKY-DT2 are available to Mediacom subscribers in the Sonora and Upton area along Hardin County's boundary with Larue County.

Suddenlink cable systems in Logan County carried WNKY's primary channel on cable channel 15. The station's NBC and CBS subchannels were later dropped from all Suddenlink cable channel lineups in that county, including Russellville. Russellville Electric Power Board, a municipal electric power distributor in Russellville, carried WNKY's NBC- and CBS-affiliated subchannels until it discontinued carriage of the station in favor of WSMV and WTVF, respectively, on December 30, 2016.

References

External links

Marquee Broadcasting
Television channels and stations established in 1989
NKY
NBC network affiliates
MeTV affiliates
1989 establishments in Kentucky